Abdui (also Romanized as ‘Abdū’ī; also known as ‘Abdūl and Abdūnī) is a village in Dasht-e Barm Rural District, Kuhmareh District, Kazerun County, Fars Province, Iran. At the 2006 census, its population was 525, in 123 families.

References 

Populated places in Kazerun County